Zhongyuan Economic Zone or Central Plain Economic Zone is the proposed economic development zone for the economic region in Henan Province and radiating to the surrounding areas by the Henan Provincial Government and the Chinese Central Government.

See also
 Zhongyuan

References

Economy of China
Special Economic Zones of China